Bertrand Nogaro (5 April 1880 – 7 April 1950) was a French economist and politician. He served as Minister of Public Instruction and Fine Arts in Aristide Briand's tenth government from June to July 1926.

He was elected to the Académie des sciences morales et politiques in 1949.

References 

 https://www2.assemblee-nationale.fr/sycomore/fiche/%28num_dept%29/5569
 Jean Jolly, Dictionnaire des parlementaires français (1889-1940), PUF, 1960

1880 births
1950 deaths
French economists
Members of the Académie des sciences morales et politiques
Members of the 13th Chamber of Deputies of the French Third Republic
Members of the 14th Chamber of Deputies of the French Third Republic
Members of the 15th Chamber of Deputies of the French Third Republic
French politicians